Mumaella is a monotypic genus of daesiid camel spiders, first described by Mark Harvey in 2002. Its single species, Mumaella robusta is distributed in Afghanistan.

References 

Solifugae
Arachnid genera
Monotypic arachnid genera